James H. Gresham (born October 14, 1934 in Selma, Alabama), is a soul singer and writer. BMI list 14 songs to his credit. He wrote and produced records in Los Angeles in the 1960s. He also played in Rosey Grier's band, and wrote and produced records for Rosey's record label "Tac-Ful". He has appeared on shows with the late Wilson Pickett, Joe Tex, and many other "Soul Greats".

USN
He served in the United States Navy during the Korean War and was awarded the National Defense Medal, and the China Service Medal.

Prison
As of October 2008, he is in his 16th year of incarceration in a United States Federal Prison. He is serving a 30-year sentence without chance of parole. Gresham was convicted for his involvement with a group of Marielitos that were sponsored out into his neighborhood in 1980 by the Federal Emergency Management Agency (FEMA), following the Mariel Boat Lift. They were convicted of conspiracy to traffic cocaine. He was given the 30-year sentence in the same courthouse where, at the age of 18, he took the Navy oath.  Jimmy Gresham was a first time and a non-violent offender.

Notes

American soul musicians
Living people
1934 births
Musicians from Selma, Alabama
United States Navy personnel of the Korean War
American prisoners and detainees
American drug traffickers